Conus litteratus, common name the lettered cone, is a species of sophisticated predatory sea snail, a marine gastropod mollusk in the family Conidae, the cone snail, cone shells or cones.

Like all species within the genus Conus, these snails are predatory and venomous. They are capable of "stinging" humans, therefore live ones should be handled carefully or not at all.

Description
The size of the shell varies between 24 mm and 186 mm. The thick, heavy shell has a flat spire. Its color is cream with 2-3 axial bands of yellow or orange bands dotted with black.

Habitat
It can be found in sand in and among coral in shallow water.

Distribution
This is a widespread Indo-Pacific species, occurring in the Indian Ocean off Tanzania, Madagascar, the Mascarene Basin.

Life habits
This cone species hunts and eats marine worms.

References

 Linnaeus, C. (1758). Systema Naturae per regna tria naturae, secundum classes, ordines, genera, species, cum characteribus, differentiis, synonymis, locis. Editio decima, reformata. Laurentius Salvius: Holmiae. ii, 824 pp 
 Puillandre N., Duda T.F., Meyer C., Olivera B.M. & Bouchet P. (2015). One, four or 100 genera? A new classification of the cone snails. Journal of Molluscan Studies. 81: 1-23

Gallery

External links
 Conus litteratus Picture - An image of this species
 Conus litteratus - Information on this species
 Cone Shells - Knights of the Sea
 

litteratus
Gastropods described in 1758
Taxa named by Carl Linnaeus